Tuhami (also its variant Thami) is an Arabic origin surname and a masculine given name. People with the name include:

Surname
 Abdel-Gader Tuhami, Libyan intelligence office
 Anuar Tuhami (born 1995), Moroccan football player
 Hassan Tuhami (1924–2009), Egyptian politician

Given name
 Thami Mdaghri (died 1856), Moroccan writer and composer
 Tuhami al-Wazzani (1903–1972), Moroccan historian

Surnames of Moroccan origin
Arabic masculine given names
Surnames from given names